Melanodryas is a genus of passerine birds in the Australasian robin family Petroicidae.

The genus was introduced by the English ornithologist and bird artist John Gould in 1865 with the hooded robin (Melanodryas cucullata) as the type species. The genus name combines the Ancient Greek melanos "black" with dryad "tree-nymph".

Species
The genus contains two species:

References

External links

 
Petroicidae
Bird genera
Taxonomy articles created by Polbot